General elections were held in Mexico on 4 July 1982. The presidential elections were won by Miguel de la Madrid, who received 74% of the vote. In the Chamber of Deputies election, the Institutional Revolutionary Party won 299 of the 372 seats, as well as winning 63 of the 64 seats in the Senate election. Voter turnout was 75% in the presidential election and 73% and 66% for the two parts of the Chamber elections.

Rosario Ibarra, who was nominated presidential candidate by the Revolutionary Workers' Party, was the first woman ever to run for president in a Mexican election.

These would be the last of the symbolic/non-competitive presidential elections in which the PRI (in power since 1929) and its presidential candidate faced no serious opposition and won by a huge margin.

Background
The previous presidential elections, celebrated in 1976, had featured only one presidential candidate (José López Portillo). The lack of any opposition in that election raised serious doubts, nationally and internationally, regarding the legitimacy of the Mexican political system under the PRI, which had been in power since 1929. Due to this, a political reform was passed in 1977 which allowed many more parties to compete in federal elections (notoriously including the decades-old Mexican Communist Party, which until then had been barred from participating in elections) as well as providing better representation for opposition parties in the Chamber of the Deputies.

As a result, nine political parties were able to participate in the 1982 elections. In the presidential election, there were seven registered candidates, which at the time was the biggest number of candidates registered in a presidential election and was a stark contrast with the single-candidate election of 1976.

Nonetheless, these proved to be rather cosmetic changes, as the PRI continued to be the dominant party and practices of vote buying and electoral fraud remained widespread. It wasn't until the mid-to-late 80's that the PRI began to face real challenges at the state and federal levels by opposition parties (particularly, by the PAN and the PRD).

Designation of the PRI presidential candidate 
By 1981, the officials that were perceived by the public opinion as having the most possibilities of being chosen by López Portillo to succeed him in the Presidency were Jorge Díaz Serrano (Director General of PEMEX), Miguel de la Madrid (Secretary of Programming and the Budget) and Javier García Paniagua (National President of the PRI). Among them, initially Díaz Serrano was apparently the most favoured to obtain the presidential candidacy, being a long-time friend of López Portillo and enjoying the popularity that came with the financial boom that the country had enjoyed in those years due to the high international oil prices and the discovery and development of new oil fields during Díaz Serrano's tenure in PEMEX, as Mexico had become one of the main oil exporters in previous years (a famous phrase in this respect was said by President López Portillo in August 1977, when he stated that the country should become used to "administering the abundance").

However, in June 1981 the international oil prices plummeted, and Díaz Serrano, without the authorization of the economic cabinet, consequently announced that Mexico would lower the prices of its oil by 4 dollars. The controversy unleashed by Díaz Serrano's decision resulted in his resignation as Director General of PEMEX and, with it, the end of his presidential aspirations.

In this manner, the two serious contenders that remained were García Paniagua and De la Madrid. García Paniagua, son of General Marcelino García Barragán, was a faithful reflection of the post-revolutionary political elite, and was identified with the "populist" sector which was more inclined to uphold the discourse of the Mexican Revolution and to continue López Portillo's general policies. In contrast, De la Madrid (who had a post graduate degree in Public Administration from Harvard University) was perceived as a skilled technocrat, mainly recognized for the elaboration of the Global Development Plan, which was announced in April 1980 and was intended to guide the planning of the economic policy of the López Portillo government.

The fall in the oil prices in June 1981 radically altered the national scene, and the process of the selection of the PRI presidential candidate took place while an increasingly serious economic crisis was taking over the nation. The uncertainty threatened with paralysing the public administration, so López Portillo was forced to announce, ahead of time, on 25 September the chosen person to succeed him as President of the Republic: Miguel de la Madrid Hurtado.

The selection of De la Madrid was mainly due to the fact that, in the middle of the crisis which was beginning to wreak havoc in the national economy, López Portillo considered that his Secretary of Programming and the Budget was the best man to face the situation because of his administrative skill (particularly due to his elaboration of the aforementioned Global Development Plan). As De la Madrid himself would latter recount, García Paniagua's reaction at not having been the chosen one was particularly aggressive, and so he was replaced in the Presidency of the PRI by Pedro Ojeda Paullada a couple of weeks after the announcement.

The designation of De la Madrid aroused significant opposition from inside the party, specially from its more traditional sectors, since the candidate was perceived as a conservative technocrat with no political skill (in fact, just like López Portillo before him, De la Madrid had never held a popularly elected post at the time of his nomination as presidential candidate). One of those dissatisfied was the old leader of the CTM, Fidel Velázquez, who had reportedly favoured García Paniagua. In contrast, the announcement of De la Madrid's candidacy was well received by the banking community and the private sector, which was reflected by a 10-point increase in the Mexican Stock Exchange the day of his nomination.
In spite of the initial hostility by many sectors inside the PRI, in the end De la Madrid manage to consolidate his position and to gather the support of his party, agglutinating the so-called "cargada priísta" around himself.

Campaign and economic crisis 
After being nominated as presidential pre-candidate, De la Madrid appointed Manuel Bartlett Díaz as General Coordinator of his campaign, while he entrusted the direction of the PRI's Institute of Political, Economic and Social Studies (IEPES) to his old collaborator from the Secretariat of Programming and the Budget, Carlos Salinas de Gortari. In practice, Bartlett acted as the "Political chief" of the campaign, and Salinas de Gortari was its "Economic chief".

1981 and 1982 were particularly difficult years for the Mexican economy. At the time of De la Madrid's nomination in September 1981, the public finances of the nation had already begun to experience the first ravages as a consequence of the fall in oil prices in June. Nonetheless, at first the discourse of De la Madrid's campaign, while not denying the crisis, preferred to focus on other subjects and didn't deviate significantly from the traditional "nationalist" and "revolutionary" tone of previous PRI campaigns. De la Madrid proposed seven central theses as the centrepiece of his campaign: "Revolutionary nationalism", "integral democratization", "egalitarian society", "decentralization of the national life", "development, employment and fight against inflation", "democratic planning" and, the most famous of them all, "moral renovation of the society". The latter, which emphasised stopping and fighting government corruption, had a particular impact on voters, since the López Portillo administration had been mired in grave corruption scandals at all levels, involving officials appointed by the President (the more infamous cases were those of Arturo Durazo Moreno aka "El Negro Durazo", Jorge Díaz Serrano and Carlos Hank González) and even members of the president's family (many of whom also held government positions during his presidency). In this context, according to a poll from October 1981, 70% of the population considered that corruption in Mexico had reached "gigantic levels".

As the months passed, the economy continued to deteriorate: from September 1981 to January 1982, capital flight and distrust of the national economy skyrocketed. On 5 January 1982, the government urged people to avoid the waste of gasoline, warning that otherwise it would have to impose rationing. In February, the López Portillo government was forced to devalue the peso, leaving it at an exchange rate of 46 pesos per US dollar. By then, the government had already lost 3,000 million dollars from its international reserves. In spite of this first devaluation, speculation and capital flight did not cease, inflation continued rising, and the government had to adjust the public tariffs.

At a campaign stop at Villahermosa, De la Madrid hinted at legalizing abortion, stating that "as the rate of population growth increases, scarce resources -and I refer here to resources generally, not only economic resources- fail to keep pace with that growth", and addressed the necessity of discussing issues "such as respect for the freedom not only of the couple but especially of women, with a view to giving them truly free choices and protecting their health", explicitly referring to "the topic of abortion -a delicate matter to deal with, but one that has been touched upon here- because it is a topic that society cannot disregard".

In March, as a concession to the PRI candidate, López Portillo made some changes in his cabinet and appointed Jesús Silva-Herzog Flores and Miguel Mancera Aguayo (both close to De la Madrid) as Secretary of the Treasury and Director of the Bank of Mexico, respectively.

As the economic crisis worsened, the De la Madrid campaign began to adopt a more "realist" tone. In a speech delivered by the candidate on 24 May 1982 at León, Guanajuato, De la Madrid advocated a profound program that included fighting inflation and currency volatility, he committed to avoiding a recession and protecting employment, and he finally expressed his rejection of "populism and any form of demagogy". Many commenters pointed out that De la Madrid himself, as Secretary of Programming and the Budget and as the author of the "Global Development Plan" in 1980 – which had not anticipated a fall in the oil prices and whose mechanisms turned out to be insufficient to deal with the subsequent disaster – was to some extent responsible for the economic crisis.

The PRI was criticized for the high cost of the official campaign in spite of the nation's critical financial situation. In defense, De la Madrid stated that "We could have saved lots of money focusing the campaign on  TV and radio, but the Mexican idiosyncrasy demands that the people meet their candidate and have the opportunity to convey their problems to him" and that he preferred "the cost of political campaigns to the cost of the repression that dictatorial regimes carry with them". De la Madrid made an extensive tour of the national territory, as was the tradition for Priísta presidential candidates; journalist Isabel Arvide, who was sent by El Sol de México to cover the campaign, stated that De la Madrid toured more than 114 000 kilometers on his campaign.

On 19 June the Unified Socialist Party of Mexico (PSUM) carried out the closing campaign rally of its presidential candidate, Arnoldo Martínez Verdugo, at the Zócalo in Mexico City. The event was of particular importance, both for it being the first opposition demonstration to be held at the Zócalo in 14 years (since the student protests and the subsequent Tlatelolco Massacre in 1968, the government had barred opposition organizations from using the compound), and for the relatively big assistance that it had, with many thousands of PSUM sympathizers joining that day. The event was remembered by the press as the "Red Zócalo".

In spite of the worsening economic crisis and the corruption scandals of the López Portillo administration, the PRI held a lead in opinion polls and, as it had always happened since it took power in 1929, its candidate was the eventual winner of the election by a large margin, as the opposition remained divided and none of its candidates had enough political strength to effectively challenge De la Madrid and the massive political apparatus of the PRI. De la Madrid's aforementioned proposal of "Moral renovation of the society" was also credited as a reason for his decisive victory, as voters hoped that the austere, reserved candidate would indeed make a serious effort to finally curb corruption in Mexico. In addition, De la Madrid was able to distance himself from López Portillo and to project himself as a serious, hard-working technocrat who was the "perfect antidote" for the social and economic disaster left by his predecessor.

Results

President

By state
The results by state were validated by the Chamber of Deputies in the same session as the national-level results, despite several differences.

Senate

Chamber of Deputies

Aftermath 
The increase in voter turnout, which was of 74.82% according to official figures, was widely celebrated by the government as an advance against abstentionism.
In spite of it and of the positive result for the PRI, the economic condition continued to deteriorate. In August, the country declared a moratorium on its foreign debt and the peso suffered another devaluation, remaining at an exchange rate of around 70 pesos per US dollar. Towards the end of the year it had further fallen to 149 pesos per dollar, which meant that the accumulated devaluation in 1982 was of 470%.

The discredit of López Portillo near the end of his presidency, amid the severe economic crisis and the monumental corruption scandals which involved members of his government and his family, had no precedent in the recent memory of the nation.

The situation was such that on 1 September 1982, during his final Address to the Congress, President López Portillo asked for forgiveness from the nation's poor for having failed to improve their condition, as he shed some tears. In the same Address to the Congress, López Portillo decreed the nationalization of the banks and a generalized exchange control. These measures, taken only three months before his term was set to end, caused serious differences between López Portillo and President-elect De la Madrid, who had expressed his complete disagreement with the measures and would later write that "it implied a severe lack of respect for me and a suspicion that the President intended to condition my government". The relationship between the two became more distant in the following months, as De la Madrid perceived that López Portillo, through his son José Ramón, was trying to exercise too much power for an outgoing President and that he was trying to overshadow the President-elect.

The National Action Party (PAN), which had nominated Pablo Emilio Madero as its presidential candidate, claimed that there had been many irregularities in the election, such as an unrestricted use of public resources in favor of the PRI candidates, emptying of electoral rolls, stuffing of ballot boxes, and that many ballots with votes for Madero and other opposition candidates had been thrown into the garbage by PRI officials; while they didn't go so far as to dispute that De la Madrid had indeed won, the PAN argued that the margin of victory of the PRI candidate had been artificially inflated and that Madero had obtained at least 4 million votes. With these arguments, in the 9 September session of the Chamber of Deputies, the PAN voted against the ruling which officially declared De la Madrid as President-elect.

Notes

References

Presidential elections in Mexico
Mexico
General
Legislative elections in Mexico
July 1982 events in Mexico